Störsvik is a village located in the southern part of Siuntio municipality, about  south of the Siuntio Station Area. It has a population of about 268 (2017).

References

Siuntio
Villages in Finland